Elizabeth Jane "Janie" Wagstaff (born July 22, 1974) is an American former competition swimmer and Olympic champion.

Wagstaff was born in Kansas City, Missouri.

Wagstaff appeared on the international swimming stage when she took third place in both the 100-meter and 200-meter backstroke events at the 1991 World Aquatics Championships in Perth, Australia.  At the 1992 Summer Olympics in Barcelona, Spain, Wagstaff earned a gold medal by swimming for the winning U.S. team in the preliminary heats of the 4×100-meter medley relay.

Wagstaff accepted an athletic scholarship to attend the University of Florida in Gainesville, Florida, where she swam for coach Mitch Ivey and coach Chris Martin's Florida Gators swimming and diving team in National Collegiate Athletic Association (NCAA) competition in 1993 and 1994.  Wagstaff was a member of the Gators' NCAA championship 4×100-meter medley relay in 1994, together with teammates Shannon Price, Ashley Tappin and Nicole Haislett, and won five Southeastern Conference (SEC) individual championships and five SEC titles as a member of winning Gators relay teams.  During her two-year career as a Gator swimmer, she received eleven All-American honors.

Wagstaff left the University of Florida in September 1994 to train full-time for the 1996 Summer Olympics.

See also 

 List of Olympic medalists in swimming (women)
 List of University of Florida alumni
 List of University of Florida Olympians
 List of World Aquatics Championships medalists in swimming (women)

References 

1974 births
Living people
American female backstroke swimmers
Florida Gators women's swimmers
Olympic gold medalists for the United States in swimming
Sportspeople from Kansas City, Missouri
Swimmers at the 1992 Summer Olympics
World Aquatics Championships medalists in swimming
Medalists at the 1992 Summer Olympics
Universiade medalists in swimming
Universiade silver medalists for the United States